Ferdinand van Apshoven, 'the elder,'  is recorded to have been baptized at Antwerp, on 17 May 1576. In 1592–93 he entered the atelier of Adam van Noort, and in 1596–97 he was free of the Guild of Painters of that city. He was both an historical painter and a portraitist; but no work by him exists. That he was successful as a teacher in art is evident, for the records of the Guild mention seven pupils of his. He died in 1654 or 1655.

References
 

Flemish Baroque painters
1576 births
1650s deaths
Painters from Antwerp